Patrick Henry Ray (May 8, 1842 in Waukesha County, Wisconsin – 1911), was a brigadier general in the United States Army. His father, Adam E. Ray, was a member of the Wisconsin State Assembly. An uncle, George Augustus Ray, was also a member. On April 22, 1889, Ray married Ada Blackman.

Career
After the outbreak of the American Civil War, Ray enlisted with the 2nd Wisconsin Volunteer Infantry Regiment of the Union Army. By war's end, he was a captain with the 1st Wisconsin Heavy Artillery Regiment.

In 1867, he received a new commission in the regular Army. He would later take part in the American Indian Wars.

In 1881, he established a meteorological and magnetic observation station at Barrow, Alaska. In 1885, the Ray River was named after him, and the Ray Mountains were in turn named after the River. During the Spanish–American War, Ray commanded the District of North Alaska. Afterwards, Ray would command Fort Snelling and what is now Fort William Henry Harrison. He was promoted to brigadier general in 1906.

References

1842 births
1911 deaths
Military personnel from Wisconsin
American military personnel of the Indian Wars
American military personnel of the Spanish–American War
People from Waukesha County, Wisconsin
People of Wisconsin in the American Civil War
Union Army officers
Union Army soldiers
United States Army generals